The 1898 Princeton Tigers football team was an American football team that represented Princeton University as an independent during the 1898 college football season. The team compiled an 11–0–1 record, shut out 11 of 12 opponents, and outscored all opponents by a total of 266 to 5. Art Hillebrand was the team captain. There was no coach.

There was no contemporaneous system in 1898 for determining a national champion. However, Princeton was retroactively named as the national champion by one selector, Parke H. Davis, a Princeton alumnus. Harvard finished with an 11–0 record and was named as the national champion by the Billingsley Report, Helms Athletic Foundation, Houlgate System, and National Championship Foundation.

Two Princeton players were selected as consensus first-team players on the 1898 All-America team: end Lew Palmer and tackle Art Hillebrand.  Hillebrand was later inducted into the College Football Hall of Fame.  Other notable players included end Art Poe and guard Big Bill Edwards.

Schedule

References

Princeton
Princeton Tigers football seasons
College football national champions
College football undefeated seasons
Princeton Tigers football